Arcinella is a genus of bivalve mollusc in the family Chamidae.

Species
 Arcinella arcinella (Linnaeus, 1767)
 Arcinella brasiliana (Nicol, 1953)
 Arcinella californica (Dall, 1903)
 Arcinella cornuta Conrad, 1866
Synonyms
 Arcinella carinata Philippi, 1844: synonym of Basterotina angulata (S. V. Wood, 1857)
 Arcinella cruda Dall, Bartsch & Rehder, 1938: synonym of Cardita hawaiensis (Dall, Bartsch & Rehder, 1938)
 Arcinella hawaiensis Dall, Bartsch & Rehder, 1938: synonym of Cardita hawaiensis (Dall, Bartsch & Rehder, 1938)
 Arcinella laevis Philippi, 1844: synonym of Kurtiella bidentata (Montagu, 1803) 
 Arcinella laysana Dall, Bartsch & Rehder, 1938: synonym of Cardita hawaiensis (Dall, Bartsch & Rehder, 1938)
 Arcinella sandalina Monterosato, 1872: synonym of Gregariella semigranata (Reeve, 1858)
 Arcinella spinosa Schumacher, 1817: synonym of Arcinella arcinella (Linnaeus, 1767)
 Arcinella thaanumi Dall, Bartsch & Rehder, 1938: synonym of Cardita excisa Philippi, 1847

References

 Coan, E. V.; Valentich-Scott, P. (2012). Bivalve seashells of tropical West America. Marine bivalve mollusks from Baja California to northern Peru. 2 vols, 1258 pp

External links
 Schumacher, C. F. (1817). Essai d'un nouveau système des habitations des vers testacés. Schultz, Copenghagen. iv + 288 pp., 22 pls.

Chamidae
Bivalve genera